Yana Mykhailivna Dementieva (born 23 October 1978 in Kharkiv) is a Ukrainian rower. At the 2012 Summer Olympics Dementyeva won the gold medal in the quadruple sculls event with Kateryna Tarasenko, Anastasiya Kozhenkova and Nataliya Dovhodko. She is also a World and European champion in the quadruple sculls, as well as being a European champion in the double sculls.

At the 2004 Olympics, she was disqualified with her team after one of her teammates, Olena Olefirenko, tested positive for ethamivan. At the 2008 Summer Olympics, she reached the B final in the women's double sculls.

References 

 
 

1978 births
Living people
Ukrainian female rowers
Sportspeople from Kharkiv
Olympic rowers of Ukraine
Rowers at the 2004 Summer Olympics
Rowers at the 2008 Summer Olympics
Rowers at the 2012 Summer Olympics
Olympic gold medalists for Ukraine
Olympic medalists in rowing
Medalists at the 2012 Summer Olympics
World Rowing Championships medalists for Ukraine